Dar Ibn Abi Dhiaf is a palace in the medina of Tunis, located near the Pasha Street and Sidi Mahrez Mosque, in the Ibn Abi Diaf dead end.

history 

The palace was built by the minister Ahmad ibn Abi Diyaf in the 19th century.

Architecture

References 

Ibn Abi Dhiaf